Udom Jokrob (Thai  อุดม จอกรบ) is a Thai footballer. He plays for Thailand Premier League clubside Chula United.

External links
Profile at Thaipremierleague.co.th

1978 births
Living people
Udom Jokrob
Association football midfielders